Ormetica neira is a moth of the family Erebidae. It was described by William Schaus in 1905. It is found in Brazil.

References

Ormetica
Moths described in 1905